Laksefjorden is a fjord located entirely in Lebesby Municipality in Troms og Finnmark county, Norway. The fjord is situated in a sparsely populated area, with only few and small settlements along the fjord, including Lebesby, Kunes, Ifjord, and Veidnes. The fjord is surrounded by the Sværholt Peninsula to the west and the Nordkinn Peninsula to the east, and it empties to the north into the Barents Sea. Norwegian County Road 888 follows the southern and eastern shoreline of the fjord.

See also
 List of Norwegian fjords

References

Fjords of Troms og Finnmark
Lebesby